The following companies manufacture, or have manufactured, model aircraft.

Flying

Ready-to-fly
A ready-to-fly model has the airframe assembled but may or may not have an engine or other equipment fitted.

Almost Ready-to-fly
Guillow

Kits
A flying model kit requires a good deal of work to construct the airframe before it can fly.

Black Horse Models (Vietnam)
Diels Engineering (USA)
Easy Built Models  (USA)
FMK Model kits (UK & Bulgaria)
Frog (UK)
Flite Test (USA)
Keil-Kraft (UK)
Kipera Craft (Japan)
Kyosho (Japan)
DiWings Aeromodelismo (ARG)
Mercury (UK)
Minamikawachi Aero Models (Japan) - ex-Lattle Snake
OK Model (Japan)
Peck-Polymers（USA)
Seagull Models (Vietnam)
SIG (USA)
Studio Mid (Japan)
The Miniature Aircraft Factory (UK & Bulgaria)
The World Models (Hong Kong, China)
Tiger Seisakusyo (Japan)
Tough Jets  (USA)
Tubame Gangu (Japan)
Veron (UK)
Roban (China)
Yamada (Japan)

Static

To scale
Static scale models are used for collection or display.

Aero le Plane (Hong Kong SAR)
AeroClassics (USA)
Atlantic-Models, Inc. (USA) 
Calibre Wings (Singapore) 
Corgi Toys (UK)
Blue Box
Dragon Wings (China)
Easy Model (China)
Factory Direct Models (USA) 
Fiberworks International (Philippines) 
Flight Miniatures (USA)
Shopping Zone Plus (Canada) 
GeminiJets (USA)
Herpa Wings (Germany)
Hobby Master (China)
Hogan Wings(UK)
IDT Jets (USA)
Inflight200
JC Wings (Hong Kong SAR)
Konishi Model (Japan)
Long Prosper (China)
Lupa Aircraft Models (Netherlands)
Matchbox (UK)
Mastercraft Collection
 PacMin (Pacific Miniatures) (USA)
Modelworks Direct (USA) 
ModelBuffs (Philippines) 
 NG Model (China) 
Phoenix Model (Taiwan)
Pinfei Model Aircraft（China）
Postage Stamp (USA)
Showcase Models
Skymarks (UK)
Socatec Aircraft Models
Squadron Nostalgia LLC (USA)
Squadron Toys (U.S.A. Officially Licensed by the U.S. Navy)  
Toys and Models Corporation
Wooster
Velocity Models
YourCraftsman/BigBird

Not to scale
These models are not scale replicas of any full-size design.

The Aeroplane Models (India)

Scale kits
A scale model is a replica of some full-size design (which may or may not be a real aircraft).

Papercraft 
FlyModel (Poland)
GPM (Poland)
Halinski (Poland)
Hooton AirCraft (UK)
JSC (Poland)
ModelArt (Bulgaria)
Modelik (Poland)
Schreiber-Bogen Kartonmodellbau (Germany)
DiWings Aeromodelismo (Argentina)

Plastic

12 Squared (USA)
3D Blitz Models (Switzerland)
A&A Models (Ukraine) - brand of Modelsvit
ABC Modelfarb (Poland)
A.B.&K Hobby Kits (Czech Republic)
Academy Minicraft (Korea)
Academy Plastic Model Co. (Korea)
Accessories Great Britain (UK)
Accurate Miniatures (USA)
Ace Corporation (Korea)
Ace Models (Ukraine)
Adams (USA)
Addar (USA)
Admiral (Czech Republic) - brand of AZ model
Advent (USA) - brand of Revell
AER-Moldova (Moldova)
Aeroclub (UK)
Aerofile (France)
Aero Team (Czech Republic)
Aero Plast (Poland)
AFV Club (Taiwan)
AGA (Poland)
AHM (USA)
AIM Fan Model (Ukraine)
Airfix (UK) - from 1950 to present
Air Lines (USA)
Airpower87 (Germany) - brand of ArsenalM
AK Interactive (Spain)
Alanger (Russia) - re-boxed many ICM kits. Went bankrupt in 2008; molds (mostly) taken over by ARK-models
Alfa (Russia)
Aliplast (Italy)
AMC Models (Czech Republic)
AML (Czech Republic)
Ammo by MIG Jimenez (Spain)
Amodel (Ukraine)
AMP (Ukraine) - brand of Mikromir
AMT (bought by ERTL toys) (USA) - no longer manufacture aircraft models
AMT-Frog (USA-UK)
AMT-Hasegawa (USA-Japan)
AMT-Matchbox (USA-UK)
AMtech (USA)
Amusing Hobby (Japan)
Answer Kits (Poland)
Antares (Czech Republic)
Aoshima Bunka Kyozai (Japan)
Apex (Russia)
Arc En Ciel (Japan)
Arii (Japan)
ARK-models (Russia) - ex-Alanger
Arma Hobby (Poland)
Armory Model Group (Ukraine)
Arsenal Model Group (Ukraine)
ART model (Ukraine)
Artiplast (Italy)
Asahi Sangyo (Japan)
Astra (Poland)
Atlantic (Italy)
Atlantis Model (USA)
Atom (Japan)
Attack Hobby Kits (Czech Republic)
Aurora Plastics Corporation (USA) - sold their molds to Monogram in 1977, and later bought by Revell
Aurora-Heller (USA-France)
AvanGarde Model Kits (AMK) (Macau, China)
Avia (Russia)
AVI Models (Czech Republic)
Avis (Ukraine) - brand of Mikromir
AV-USK / Aviation USK (USA)
AZ model (Czech Republic)
Azur (Czech Republic/France) - Brand of Special Hobby
Bachmann (USA) - imported Fujimi kits into the USA
Bandai (Japan)
Banpresto (Japan)
Bat Project (Ukraine)
Battlefront Miniatures (New Zealand)
Beechnut Models (USA)
Bego (Japan)
Ben Hobby (Japan)
Big Planes Kits (Ukraine)
Bílek (Czech Republic)
Blue Bird (Japan)
Blue Ribbon (Mexico)
Blue Tank (Taiwan)
Bobcat Hobby Model Kits (China)
BorderModel (China)
Brengun (Czech Republic)
Brifaut (France)
Bronco Models (Hong Kong, China)
Bull Mark (Japan)
Buzco (USA) - re-boxed and issued Heller kits in the USA
Cap Croix De Sud (France)
C.C.Lee (China)
Central (Japan)
Chematic (Poland)
Classic Airframes (USA)
Classic Plane (Germany)
Clear Prop! (Ukraine)
Cobra Company (USA)
Comet (USA)
Condor (Czech Republic) - Brand of Special Hobby
Condor (Ukraine)
Cooperativa (Russia)
Copper State Model (Latvia)
Crown (Japan)
Cyber-Hobby (Hong Kong, China) - brand of Dragon Models
Czech Model (Czech Republic)
DACO/Skyline (Belgium)
D-Corporation (Korea)
Dakoplast (Russia)
Das Werk (Germany)
Delta 2 (Italy) - ex-Delta
Donetsk Toys Factory (Ukraine)
Dora Wings (Ukraine)
Doyusha (Japan)
Dragon Models/DML (Hong Kong, China)
DreamModel (China)
Eaglewall (UK)
Eastern Express (Russia)
Ebbro (MMP co.,ltd.) (Japan)
Eduard (Czech Republic)
Elaga (Brazil)
Eldon (USA)
Elf (Czech Republic)
Emhar (UK)
Encore (Latvia)
Entex (USA)
ESCI (Italy)
Esci-Ertl (Italy)
Esci-Scale Craft (Italy)
Eurokit (France)
Falcon (New Zealand) 
Faller (Germany)
Fine Molds (Japan)
Firefox (Poland)
Flashback (Czech Republic)
Fly (Czech Republic)
FlyHawk Model (China)
Flying Machines (Italy)
Flugzeug (Germany)
Fonderie Miniature (France)
F-RSIN Plastic (France)
Frog (UK) - from 1930s to 1970s. Moulds taken over by Novo and Revell
Freedom Model Kits (FMK)  (Taiwan / EU) - 2014 - present
Frems (Italy)
F-Toys (Japan)
Fuji Hobby (Japan)
Fujimi (Japan)
GaleForce Nine (USA)
Gartex (Japan) - brand of Hasegawa
Gaspatch Models (Greece)
Gavia (Czech Republic)
Glencoe Models (USA)
G-Mark (Japan)
Golden Ade Hobby Kits (Ukraine) - brand of Olimp Models
Gran (Russia)
Grand Phoenix Model Products (USA)
Great Wall Hobby (China)
Greenbank Castle (USA)
Greenmax (Japan)
Griffon (Japan) - Only produced one kit (Su-22 in 1/72nd scale) before disappearing.
Grip (Japan) - ex-Eidai
Gunze Sangyo (Japan)
Hapdong Tech (Korea)
Hasegawa Corporation (Japan) -  first products in 1961
Hawk (USA)
Hehexing (China)
Heller SA (France)
Heller-Humbrol (France) (Heller ownership)
HGW Models (Czech Republic)
High Planes (Australia)
Hi-Tech (France)
Hit Kit (Poland)
HK Models (Hong Kong, China)
HMA Garage (Japan)
Hobby 2000 (Poland)
Hobby Boss (China)
Hobbycraft (Canada)
Hobby Network (Japan)
Hobby Spot U (Japan)
HPM (HiPM) (Czech Republic)
Hippo (Czech Republic)
HR Model (Czech Republic)
Huma modell (Germany)
Ibex Plastic Models (Israel)
IBG Models (Poland)
ICM (Ukraine)
Idea (Korea)
Ideal Toy Company (ITC) (USA)
Ikar (ИКАР) (Russia)
Ikko Mokei (Japan)
IloveKit (China)
IM (International Modeling) (USA)
Imai Kagaku (Japan)
IMC (Industro-Motive Corporation) (USA)
Imex Model (USA)
Infinity Models (Czech Republic) - brand of HpH models
Innex Model (Poland)
Inpact Kits (UK)
Intech (Poland)
Interavia (Ukraine)
IOM-kit (Ukraine) - brand of Mikromir
Italaerei (Italy) - renamed to Italeri
Italeri (Italy)
Jach (Czech Republic)
JAYS Hobby Products (New Zealand) - Online Store Based in The Catlins, NZ. EST.2008 
JAYS Model Kits (New Zealand) - sold through JAYS Hobby Products
Jo-Han (USA)
Kader (Hong Kong, China)
KA Models (Korea)
Kangnam (Korea)
Karaya (Poland)
Karo-as Modellbau (Germany)
Kawai (Japan)
K&B (USA)
Keil-Kraft (UK) - mainly flying models but some plastic kits
Kepuyuan (China)
Kiddyland (Taiwan)
Kiko (Brazil)
Kinetic (Hong Kong, China)
Ki-Tech (Hobbycraft Canada production in China)
Kitty Hawk Model (China)
KitPro (Czech Republic)
Kiwi Wings (New Zealand) - see Tasman Model Products.
Koga (Japan)
Kogure (Japan)
Korpak (Belarus) - ex-Mir
KoPro (Czech Republic) - ex-KP
Kora Models (Czech Republic)
Kōtare Models (New Zealand)
Kovozavody Semily (Czechoslovakia)
KP (Kovozávody Prostějov) (Czechoslovakia) - from 1969
KP Models (Hungary) - acquired Czech KP(Kopro) in 2009
Legato (Czech Republic) - brand of AZ model
Leoman (USA)
LF Models (Czech Republic)
Life-Like (USA)
Lincoln International (Hong Kong, UK)
Lindberg (USA)
LionRoar (China)
Lodela (Mexico) - see Plasticos Lodela
LO Model (Taiwan)
LS (L&S) (Japan)
LTD Models (USA)
Mac Distribution (Czech Republic)
Mach 2 (France)
Mania Hobby (Japan) - ex-Mania
Mannen (Japan) - ex-Modeler
Maquette (Russia)
Marivox (Sweden)
Mark I. Models (Czech Republic)
Mars Models (Ukraine)
Marufuji (Japan)
Marusan (Japan)
Master Craft (Poland)
Matchbox (UK) - ceased production, some moulds taken over by Revell Germany
Mauve (Japan)
Meikraft Models (USA) - ceased production of limited run plastic kits, later kits of are of very good quality
Meng Model (China)
Merit (UK) - ceased production of plastic model aircraft sometime in the late 1950s
Merit International (USA)
Merlin Model (UK)
MGD Models (Czech Republic)
Micro Ace (Japan) - ex-Arii
Micro Scale Design (Russia)
Midori Plastic. Kit (KSN) (Japan)
Mikro72 (Poland)
MikroMir (Ukraine)
MiniArt (Ukraine)
Minibace (China)
Minicraft Model Kits, Inc. (USA)
MiniHobbyModels (Macau, China) - brand of Trumpeter
Miniwing (Czech Republic)
Mir (Belarus) - renamed to Korpak
Mirage Hobby (Poland)
Miroslav Němeček (Czech Republic)
Mister Kit (Italy)
Mitsuwa Model (Japan)
Mixkit (France)
Miyauchi (Japan)
Modela (Czechoslovakia)
Modelcollect (China)
Modelcraft (Canada)
Modelism (Romania)
Modelist (Russia) - re-boxed kits from Academy, Trumpeter, Dakoplast etc.
Model News (Czech Republic)
Modelsvit (Ukraine)
Model USA (USA)
Modelworks Direct (USA) 
Monochrome (Japan) - brand of Interallied
Monogram (USA) - bought by Revell
Model Products Corporation (MPC)
Model Russia (Russia)
MP (Japan) - ex-Million Mokei
MPM production s.r.o. (Czech Republic)
MRC (USA)
MTS (Czech Republic)
Munin Models (Sweden)
MustHave! Models (France)
Nakamura Sangyo (Japan)
Nakotne (Latvia)
NAL / C-CADD Model Shop (India)
NBK Model Kit (Nihon Bunka Kyozai) (Japan)
NC Models (Japan)
Nichimo (Japan)
Nihon Plastic (Japan)
Nishikiya Models (J.N.M.C.) (Japan)
Nitto (Japan)
Niplast (Serbia)
NKAP (Russia) - see Ikar
NOVO Aircraft Kits (UK/USSR)
Occidental Réplicas (Portugal)
Octopus (Czech Republic)
ODK (Odaka) (Japan)
OEZ (Czech Republic)- kits later reboxed by Smer, Airfix and Revell at various times
Ogonek (Russia)
OKB-144 (Russia)
Olimp Models (Ukraine)
One Man Model (Japan)
Orange Hobby (China)
Oriental Model (Japan)
Otaki (Japan) - went bankrupt in the mid 80's. Molds acquired later by Doyusha & Arii.
OzMods Scale Models (Australia)
Pacific Coast Models (USA)
Panda Models (China)
Pantera (Poland)
Paramount (Canada)
Parc Models (Romania)
Pavla Models (Czech Republic)
Pegaso/Necomisa (Mexico)
Pegasus (UK)
Pegasus Hobbies (USA)
Pilot Repricas (Sweden)
Pioneer 2 (UK)
Pit-load (Japan)
PJ Production (Belgium)
Plasticart (East Germany) - see VEB Plasticart
Plasticos Lodela (Mexico)
Plastic Planet (Czech Republic)
Platz (Japan)
Plusmodel (Czech Republic)
PM Model (Turkey)
Politechnika (Russia)
Precision Hobby Kits (USA) - 1950's
Premier Planes (UK)
Premiere (UK)
Profiline (Czech Republic)
Pro Modeler (USA) - brand of Revell-Monogram
Pyro Plastics Corporation (Pyro) (USA)
PZW (Poland)
Rare-Plane Detective (USA)
RCR Models (Italy)
Red Star (UK)
Red Wings (Russia)
Renwal (USA)
Retrowings (UK)
Revell (USA)
Revell-Monogram (USA)
Revell of Germany (Germany) - split from Revell US
Ringo (USA) - ex-ITC
Rising Models (Czech Republic)
Rocket Models (Japan)
Roden (Ukraine)
Roskopf (Germany)
R.P.M. (Poland)
RS models (Czech Republic)
Rubicon Models (UK)
Ruch (Poland)
R.V.Aircraft (Czech Republic)
Saneki Model (Japan)
Sankyo Mokei (Japan)
Sanshoh (Japan)
Sanwa Plastic (Japan)
Sabre Kits (Czech Republic)
Sector (Japan)
Seminar (Korea)
Shizukyo (Japan)
Siedlce (Poland)
Siga Models (Ukraine)
Silver Cloud (UK)
Skale Wings (Ukraine)
Skarabey (Russia)
SK Model (Poland)
Skunk Models (Hong Kong, China)
Sky-High (Ukraine) - brand of Amodel
S-Mars (China)
Směr (Czech Republic) - some molds from Heller and Artiplast/Aurora
S&M Models (UK)
Sova-M (Ukraine)
South Front (Russia)
Special Hobby (Czech Republic) - ex-MPM
Spójnia (Poland)
Stankowski (Poland)
Starfix (Israel)
STC Start (Russia)
Storm Factory (China)
Stransky (Czech Republic)
Stream (Russia)
Strombecker (USA)
Sunny International (Japan)
Supermodel (Italy) - from early 1970s
Suyata (Hong Kong, China)
Swallow Model (Japan)
Sweet (Japan)
Sword (Czech Republic)
Taimei (Japan)
Taka (Japan)
Takara (Japan)
Takom (Hong Kong, China)
Tamiya (Japan)
Tan Model (Turkey)
Tarangus (Sweden)
Tasman Model Products (New Zealand) - Now based in The Catlins, NZ 2012. see JAYS Model Kits
Tauro Model (Italy)
Techmod (Poland)
Testors (USA)
Testors-Fujimi (USA-Japan)
Testors-Italeri (USA-Italy)
Tiger Model (Hong Kong, China)
TMD (Japan)
Toga (Germany)
Toho (Japan)
Toko (Ukraine)
Tokyo Marui (Japan)
Tokyo Plamo (Japan) - ex-Sanwa Plastic
Tomy (Japan)
Tomytec (Japan)
Trimaster (Japan)
Tristar (Hong Kong, China)
Trumpeter (Macau, China)
TSM (Tokyo Sharp Mokei) (Japan)
Tsukuda Hobby (Japan)
Tupolev (Russia)
Unda (Moldova)
Unimax (Hong Kong, China)
Unimodel (Ukraine)
Union Model (Japan)
UPC (USA) imported and re-packaged kits in the 1960s from Frog, Marusan, Aoshima, Hasegawa, Fujimi & many Japanese companies
Upgrade - See Tasman Model Products
US Airfix (Airfix kits for USA market)
Valhalla (UK) - Same maker as Veeday
Valom (Czech Republic)
Varney (USA)
Vaso (Russia)
VEB Plasticart (East Germany)
Veeday (UK)
Ventura (Australia)
VES (Russia)
Victrix (UK)
Vista (Czech Republic) - ex- Kovozavody Semily
Waltersons (Hong Kong, China)
Warrior Model (Poland)
Williams Bros. (USA)
Wingman Models (Germany)
Wingnut Wings (New Zealand)
Wingsy Kits (Ukraine)
WK models (Germany)
Wolfpack Design (Korea)
X-Scale Models (Ukraine)
Xtrakit (UK)
Xuntong models (China)
YMC (Japan)
Yodel (Japan)
YTS (Asahi Mokei) (Japan)
Yumo (Jugoslavija)
Z.A. Plastic Model (Japan)
Zhengdefu (China) - ex-Kitech
Zlinek (Czech Republic)
Zoukei-Mura (Japan) - subsidiary of Volks
ZP Ruch (Poland)
ZTS Plastyk (Poland)
Zvezda (Russia)

Resin-cast/Vacuum-formed/Metal/Multi-material

A+V Models (Czech Republic) - resin
A&W Models (Japan) - resin
Aerobace (Japan) - photo-etched metal
Aeroclub (UK) - vac-form
Aircraft In Miniature (AIM) including Transport Wings (vac-forms), Rug Rat Resins, and Historic Wings (etched brass) (UK)
Air Craft Models (UK) - vac-forms
AIRFrame (The Aviation Workshop/Model Alliance) (UK) - resin
Airmodel (Germany) - resin
AirModels  (UK) - resin
Akatombo Works (Japan) - resin
Aki Products (Japan) - resin
Alliance Models (Czech Republic) - resin
Anigrand Craftswork (Hong Kong, China) - resin
Ardpol (Poland) - resin
Asuka Red Baron (Japan) - resin
Atelier Noix (Japan) - resin
Aviattic (UK) - resin
Barracuda Studios (USA) - resin
Blue Rider (UK) - vac-forms
Broplan (Poland) - vac-forms
Choroszy Modelbud (Poland) - resin
Classic Plane (Germany) - resin
CMK (Czech Master Kit) (Czech Republic) - resin, brand of Special Hobby
Collect Aire (USA) - resin
Combat Models (USA) - vac-forms
Contrail (UK) - vac-forms
Cooper Details (USA) - vac-form and resin
Croco (Latvia) - resin
Czech Master Resin (Czech Republic) - resin, brand of Mark I. Models
Dameya (Japan) - resin
D&M Daneplane (Denmark) - "Nielsen & Winther Aa" Vacu kit
DeAgostini Japan (Japan) - multi-material
Dekno (Spain) - resin
Dubena (Czechoslovakia) - vac-forms
Dujin (resin, France) - resin and vac-form
DynaVector (UK/Japan) - vac-forms
Eagle Editions (USA) - resin
Esoteric Models (UK) - vac-forms
Execuform (USA) - vac-forms
F-RSIN (France) - resin
Falcon (New Zealand) - resin and vac-forms
Fantastic Plastic Models (USA) - resin
FE Resin (Czech Republic) - resin
Fly  (Czech Republic) - injection moulding, resin and etched metal parts 
Formaplane (UK) - vac-forms
Foxone Design Studio (Japan) - resin
Fun Model (Poland) - vac-forms
Gremlin Models by Zed (Yugoslavia) - resin
Gull Model (Japan) - vac-forms
Heritage Aviation (UK) - resin
High Planes
Hobby Space Mechadoll (Japan) - resin
HpH models (Czech Republic) - resin
I.D. Models (UK) - vac-forms
Incth (Japan) - photo-etched metal
Jasmine Model (China) - photo-etched metal
JMK (Poland) - vac-forms
Joystick (UK) - vac-forms
KAJuK (Russia) - vac-forms, resin
Karaya (Poland) - resin
Kiwi Resin Models (New Zealand) - resin
Kombe Models (Denmark) - "O-maskine IO/IIO" resin kit
Konishi Model (Japan) - resin
Kora Models (Czech Republic) - resin
Koster Aero Enterprises (USA) - high quality mixed media vacuform conversions and complete subjects
Leoman Brothers (USA)  - ceased production of limited run resin kits upon death of company principle
LF Models (Czech Republic) - resin
LGW Miniatures (UK) - resin
Libramodels (UK) - vac-forms
Lino (Poland) - vac-forms
LM Models (Croatia)
Lone Star Model (USA) - vac-forms
Luedemann (Germany) - resin
Mach3 Models (Japan) - resin
Mackit (ltaly) - mixed metal/plastic
Magna Models (Spain) - resin
Matuo Kasten (Japan) - resin
Metal Time models (Ukraine) - metal
Missing Link (Germany) - resin
Miyazawa (Japan) - resin
Modelland (Poland) - vac-forms
Modelworks Direct  (USA) - resin
ModelsPark  (Latvia) - vac-forms
Nova (USA) - vac-forms
Omega Models (Czech Republic) - resin
OzMods Scale Models (Australia) - resin and vac-forms
Pepelatz (Russia) - resin
Phoenix Models (UK) - vac-forms
Planet Models (Czech Republic)  - resin, brand of Special Hobby
Pinfei Model Airplane  (China) - ABS Resin
Pro Resin (Ukraine) - resin, brand of Olimp Models
Project X (UK) - vac-forms
Prop&Jet (Russia) - vac-forms, resin
PSC (Poland) - vac-forms
Raccoon (Japan) - resin 
Rareplane (UK) - vac-forms
Replica (France) - resin
Right Stuff (Japan) - resin, ex-Trimaster
Roseplane (USA) - vac-forms
Sanger (USA) - vac-forms
S.B.S model (Hungary) - resin
Sierra Scale Models (USA) - vac-forms
Signifer (France) - resin ,ex-Sinifer
Silver Wings (Poland) - resin
Stokit (Denmark) - "KZ II T" resin kit
Tenyo (Japan) - metal
Toy Craft Berg (Japan) - resin
Triple Nuts (Japan) - resin, 3D-printed
Unicraft (Ukraine) - resin
Unlimited Air Models (Japan) - resin
Ushimodel (Japan) - resin
V1 Models (Japan) - 3D-printed
VacWings (US) - vac-forms
Vami (Belgium) - resin
VLE Models (USA) - vac-forms
Volks (Japan) - resin
VP (Canada) - vac-forms
Waku (Poland) - vac-forms
Welsh Models (UK) - vac-forms, resin and mixed resin/vac-forms
Whirlybird including Whirlykits - (UK, now owns all of the ex Maintrack masters) - resin
Wings Models (USA) - vac-forms
WK Modell (Germany) - resin
Woddy Joe (Japan) - wood and metal
Z Model (Japan) - resin

Unknown format
Please move these to the relevant section(s) above.

DiWings Aeromodelismo (Argentina)
3D Hobby Shop
Ace Hobby
Anna*Co.
Arsenal (Russia)
 Asian Craft Model Airplanes (Philippines)
Berkeley Models
Campbells Custom Kits
Can Vac
Dark Dream Studio
Dyna-Flytes
Eagle Tree Systems
Easy Built Models
Extreme Flight
Flight of Cottonwood
FlyModel
FlyteLine Models
Hobby
Leoman  reformed, used formers' masters, maker "The Other Guys" series, Soviet subjects
Long  (In Africa, & Prosper)
Mahogany Wings Corp (Philippines)
Minicopter (German)
Model Airplane Factory
Modelworks Direct
Model Factory
Mountain Models
Mugi twinwall polypropylene aircraft
Old Planes
Paperwarbirds
Pilot R/C
RC Factory Czech 
Risesoon
Schabak
SIG Manufacturing
Sterling
Stevens AeroModel USA
Stinson Aircraft
Telink (Czech Republic) 
The Model Airplane
Tough Jets 
Twisted Hobbys
Veyron Models
Warplanes
Western Models
Williamshaven
Wooden Scale Models (Philippines)

See also
List of scale model kit manufacturers

References

Model_Aircraft
 air